Koratla Assembly constituency is a constituency of Telangana Legislative Assembly, India. It is one among 3 constituencies in Jagtial district. It is part of Nizamabad Lok Sabha constituency.

Kalvakuntla Vidya Sagar Rao of Telangana Rashtra Samithi is representing the constituency since its inception in 2009.

Mandals
The Assembly Constituency presently comprises the following Mandals:

Members of Legislative Assembly

Election results

Telangana Legislative Assembly election, 2018

Telangana Legislative Assembly election, 2014

Andhra Pradesh Legislative Assembly election, 2009

Trivia
 It is only assembly constituency which has two municipalities i.e. Koratla, Metpally in Telangana.

See also
 List of constituencies of Telangana Legislative Assembly

References

Assembly constituencies of Telangana
Jagtial district